Strawberry Lake is a natural high-elevation body of water in the Strawberry Mountain Wilderness in the U.S. state of Oregon. Recreational activities in the lake basin include hiking, backpacking, skiing, and fishing.

Geology and geography
The Strawberry Mountains are eroded remnants of the mountains created by those volcanoes and by intrusions of igneous rock.

Strawberry Lake is the largest of the small glacial lakes found in the Strawberry Mountain Wilderness. Occupying part of a valley carved by ice in the Pleistocene, the lake formed behind a landslide dam across Strawberry Creek. Water from the lake does not flow over the dam except in high water but seeps through the landslide to re-form the creek several hundred yards (meters) downstream.

Despite water-quality problems stemming from recreational activity in the lake's drainage basin, the water remains transparent enough that the lake bottom is visible from the surface even at the lake's deepest point.

History
Nathan W. Fisk homesteaded in the area in 1870 and named local features Strawberry Butte (now Strawberry Mountain) and Strawberry Creek for the abundance of wild strawberries in the area, and the name spread to encompass Strawberry Valley and Strawberry Lake.

Recreation

Hiking, backpacking, and camping are among the recreational activities available near the lake. The trail continues upstream  from the lake to  Strawberry Falls and then another  to Little Strawberry Lake. Another trail leads from Strawberry Falls  to the peak of Strawberry Mountain.

The lake, frozen Strawberry Falls, and Little Strawberry Lake can be reached by cross-country skiers and snowshoers.

Fishing in the lake is allowed all year, though snow makes access difficult in winter. Many brook trout inhabit the lake as well as some rainbow trout, with fish present due to being stocked.

See also
 List of lakes in Oregon

References

Works cited
 Bishop, Ellen Morris (2003). In Search of Ancient Oregon: A Geological and Natural History. Portland, Oregon: Timber Press. 
 Sullivan, William L. (2009). Atlas of Oregon Wilderness. Eugene, Oregon: Navillus Press.

External links

 Strawberry Basin Trail #375 – U.S. Forest Service
 Strawberry Campground – U.S. Forest Service

Lakes of Oregon
Lakes of Grant County, Oregon
Malheur National Forest
Protected areas of Grant County, Oregon